Yeh Kuang-shih (born 1957 in Hualien) is a Taiwanese politician and management scientist. He was the Minister of the Ministry of Transportation and Communications from 18 February 2013 until 9 January 2015, and one of the three deputy mayors of Kaohsiung within the municipal administration of Han Kuo-yu from 25 December 2018 to 12 June 2020.

Early life
Yeh Kuang-shih was born in Hualien City in 1957. His parents are immigrants from Zhejiang, China. He graduated from National Taiwan University with a bachelor's degree in political science in 1979. He then obtained a master's degree in public administration at University of Delaware in 1984, and a PhD in organization theory at Carnegie Mellon University in 1990.

Academic career
Yeh was a professor at Sun Yat-sen University in Department of Business Administration from 1991 to 2015. He has more than 30 publications in peer-reviewed journals and has written several books on business administration.

After resigning from his post as the Minister of Transportation and Communications in 2015, Yeh left Sun Yat-sen University for the Graduate Institute of Technology Innovation & Intellectual Property Management at National Chengchi University. He retired in 2018.

Political career

Deputy Minister of the Research, Development and Evaluation Commission
Yeh served as the Deputy Minister of the Research, Development and Evaluation Commission from 2008 to 2009. During his time he participated in the Organizational Reform of Executive Yuan.

Political Deputy Minister of Transportation and Communications
From 2009 to 2013 Yeh served as the Political Deputy Minister of Transportation and Communications. During this time, he instituted Taoyuan International Airport Corporation, the operator of the Taiwan Taoyuan International Airport, and served as the first chairman.

Minister of Transportation and Communications
After Premier Sean Chen stepped down in 2013, Yeh replaced Mao Chi-kuo as the Minister of Transportation and Communications.

2013 Nantou earthquake
Right after an earthquake struck Taiwan on 27 March 2013, Yeh ordered all officials within the ministry departments to conduct checks on any damage caused by the earthquake.

Taoyuan International Airport MRT delay
Commenting on the completion delay of Taoyuan International Airport MRT in mid April 2013, Yeh said that he hoped that the line can be opened somewhere before October 2014, after the ROC Ministry of Transportation and Communications had postponed it from its original June 2013 official launch. He added that the delay is caused by the MRT electromechanical systems in which it is still currently being worked out by the appointed contractor.

In early May 2013 during a session at the Transportation Committee of the Legislative Yuan, Yeh became the target of heavy criticism due to the ongoing delay of the airport MRT completion, even the DPP asked Yeh to resign as his responsibility of the delay. Yeh responded by stating that he had already questioned the train signaling system contractor legitimacy and the tender process in choosing the contractors. He added that any dispute regarding the tender and bidding process had long been officially closed since the investigator could not find anything illegal. However, he promised to further submit all of the information found to prosecutor for further investigation.

ROC first casino
After the Executive Yuan approval in early May 2013 in establishing ROC first casino, Yeh said that ROC government considers that the casino will be established in Lienchiang, Fukien Province, not in Taiwan Island. He expected that the casino resort will house the casino, hotel, convention and other facilities. The casino resort is expected to be established in 2019 the earliest.

Resignation
On January 7, 2015, which happens to be Yeh's birthday, Yeh resigned after failure to secure support from his party to Taiwan High Speed Rail Corporation’s (THSRC) financial restructuring plan. The plan was perceived by some lawmakers to benefit the investors more than the public, or unnecessary because THSRC is not in imminent danger to go bankrupt, or the government should let the corp go bankrupt. A modified version of the financial restructuring plan was passed later that year.

Later that year, he became an adviser to Hung Hsiu-chu's presidential campaign. Hung was eventually replaced by Eric Chu to represent the party in the election.

Deputy mayor of Kaohsiung
Yeh was appointed deputy mayor of Kaohsiung in December 2018 by Han Kuo-yu, serving alongside Lee Shu-chuan and Chen Hsiung-wen. He mainly focused on policies related to economic development, transportation, tourism, culture, and education. The appointment ended in June 2020 after the recall of mayor Han.

References

Taiwanese Ministers of Transportation and Communications
Living people
Carnegie Mellon University alumni
Kuomintang politicians in Taiwan
Politicians of the Republic of China on Taiwan from Hualien County
1957 births
Academic staff of the National Sun Yat-sen University
National Taiwan University alumni
University of Delaware alumni
Deputy mayors of Kaohsiung